George Moni is a professional rugby league footballer who plays for M & J Muruks in Papua New Guinea. He is a Papua New Guinea international.

He has been named in the Papua New Guinea training squad for the 2008 Rugby League World Cup.

He has been named in the PNG squad for the 2008 Rugby League World Cup.

He played for Papua New Guinea in the 2010 Four Nations tournament.

References

External links

Living people
Papua New Guinean rugby league players
Papua New Guinean sportsmen
Papua New Guinea national rugby league team players
Mendi Muruks players
Rabaul Gurias players
1987 births
Rugby league props
Rugby league second-rows